List of famous or notable Cameroonians:

Presidents 

Ahmadou Babatoura Ahidjo
 Paul Biya

Prime ministers 

 Simon Achidi Achu
 Sadou Hayatou
 Ephraim Inoni
 Bello Bouba Maïgari
 Peter Mafany Musonge
 Philémon Yang

International diplomats 

 Nzo Ekangaki
 William Eteki

Businesspeople 
 Bony Dashaco
 Mireille Nemale (born 1949), fashion stylist

Kings 

 Rudolf Duala Manga Bell, King of Duala
 Ibrahim Njoya, Sultan of Bamoun
 Seidou Njimoluh Njoya, Sultan of the Bamum people

Other politicians 

 Charles Assalé
 Emmanuel Endeley
 Henry Ndifor Abi Enonchong
 John Ngu Foncha
 André-Marie Mbida
 Salomon Tandeng Muna
 John Fru Ndi
 Henri Hogbe Nlend
 Sarah Nwanak
 Zacharie Perevet

UPC nationalists 

 Osende Afana
 Félix Moumié
 Marthe Ekemeyong Moumié
 Ruben Um Nyobé
 Ernest Ouandié

Writers and journalists

Film 

 Sahndra Fon Dufe
 Agbor Gilbert Ebot
 Eriq Ebouaney
 Adela Elad
 Syndy Emade
 Epule Jeffrey
 Enah Johnscot
 Onyama Laura
 Gladys Ndonyi
 Nkanya Nkwai
 Yolande Welimoum

Musicians 

 Andy Allo
 Richard Bona
 Manu Dibango
 Henri Dikongue
 Charlotte Dipanda
 Stanley Enow
 Ko-c
 Ndedi Eyango
 Gasha
 Jovi
 Montess
 Michael Kiessou
 Magasco
 Coco Mbassi
 Ibrahim Njoya
 Kristo Numpuby
 Anne Marie Nzie
 Petit Pays
 Reniss
 Yung Swiss
 Sam Fan Thomas
 Barthélémy Toguo
 Zangalewa
 BeBe Zahara Benet

Clergy 

 Cardinal Christian Tumi
 Archbishop Paul Mbiybe Verdzekov

Sports

Soccer 

 Vincent Aboubakar
 Benoît Assou-Ekotto
 Sébastien Bassong
 Steve Bessong
 Samuel Eto'o 
 Yvan Eyike
 Roger Milla 
 Alex Song
 Rigobert Song
 Thomas Nkono

American football

 Roman Oben
 Ndamukong Suh

Basketball

 Alfred Aboya
 Lazare Adingono
 Joel Embiid
 Kenny Kadji (born 1988)
 Yves Mekongo Mbala
 Charles Minlend
 Luc Mbah a Moute
 Pascal Siakam

Scientists and engineers 

 Victor Anomah Ngu
 Veye Tatah, computer scientist and activist
Pelkins Ajanoh

Judges and lawyers
Ben Duala Ekoko

Mixed Martial Arts 
UFC Heavyweight Champion Francis Ngannou

See also
Demographics of Cameroon

References